Two Graves is a thriller novel by Douglas Preston and Lincoln Child. It was released on December 11, 2012 by Grand Central Publishing. This is the twelfth book in the Special Agent Pendergast series and also the third novel in the Helen trilogy. The preceding novel is Cold Vengeance.

Plot
Pendergast's bloodlust continues as he chases those responsible for the abduction of Helen, who was revealed to have been alive and well for the past twelve years at the climax of Cold Vengeance. But a new threat intrudes upon Pendergast's chase: a serial killer who holds New York City in the grip of terror.

Reception

—Review by Publishers Weekly

References

External links
 
 Two Graves by Douglas Preston and Lincoln Child

American thriller novels

Novels by Douglas Preston
Novels by Lincoln Child
Collaborative novels
Sequel novels
2012 American novels
Grand Central Publishing books